is a Japanese former professional baseball player. He played for the Chiba Lotte Marines of the Japan Pacific League in 1994 and 1995.

References

1967 births
Living people
Japanese baseball players
Chiba Lotte Marines players
Baseball people from Nagoya
Tokai University alumni